The A.R. Carroll Building is a historic commercial building on Main Street in Canehill, Arkansas. It is a two-story masonry structure, with a flat roof and a pressed metal facade on the upper level. The metal was fabricated to resemble brick, and includes an elaborate parapet. Built in 1900, the building is the finest commercial building of the period to survive in the community; it originally housed a drugstore.

The building was listed on the National Register of Historic Places in 1982.

See also
National Register of Historic Places listings in Washington County, Arkansas

References

Commercial buildings on the National Register of Historic Places in Arkansas
National Register of Historic Places in Washington County, Arkansas
Commercial buildings completed in 1900
1900 establishments in Arkansas